Ernst Emil Max Gall (17 February 1888 – 5 August 1958) was a German art historian and historic preservationist.

Life 
Born in Danzig, Gall attended the Fürst-Otto-Gymnasium in Wernigerode and from 1907 initially studied two semesters of law at the Grenoble Alpes University and the Sorbonne. From 1908, he studied art history at the Humboldt University of Berlin. His teachers included Heinrich Wölfflin and Adolph Goldschmidt. In 1915, he was awarded a Dr. phil. by Goldschmidt at the Martin Luther University of Halle-Wittenberg.

In 1920, he became a consultant at the Prussian Palaces and Gardens Foundation Berlin-Brandenburg in Berlin, responsible for eastern issues, modern art, monument conservation and palaces. In November 1929, he became director of the Prussian Palaces and Gardens Foundation Berlin-Brandenburg as successor to the Oberfinanzrat Paul Hübner. In 1933/34, he was suspended for a year due to his refusal to join the NSDAP, but was then able to continue in office. In 1945, he resigned from this office because of disagreements with the Soviet occupying power. After working briefly as an advisor on art and monument conservation issues at the American headquarters in Berlin, he became head of the museum department of the Bavarian Administration of State-Owned Palaces, Gardens and Lakes from 1946 until his retirement in 1953. In 1947, he became honorary professor for the history of architecture at the Ludwig Maximilian University of Munich.

Gall died in Munich at the age of 70. The art historian Günter Gall (1924–2008) was his son.

Work 
Gall's field of research was the History of architecture.

In 1923, he founded the Jahrbuch für Kunstwissenschaft, which he edited until 1930. In 1932, he founded the Zeitschrift für Kunstgeschichte with Wilhelm Waetzoldt.

Publications 
 Studien über das Verhältnis der niederrheinischen und französischen Architektur in der ersten Hälfte des XIII. Jahrhunderts. Teil 1. Die niederrheinischen Apsidengliederungen nach normannischem Vorbilde. Dissertation Halle 1915.
 Niederrheinische und normännische Architektur im Zeitalter der Frühgotik. Part I. Die niederrheinischen Apsidengliederungen nach normännischem Vorbilde. Reimer, Berlin 1915.
 Die gotische Baukunst in Frankreich und Deutschland. Part 1: Die Vorstufen in Nordfrankreich von der Mitte des elften bis gegen Ende des zwölften Jahrhunderts. Klinkhardt & Bierman, Leipzig 1925; 2nd supplemented edition 1955.
 Die Marienkirche zu Danzig. Burg bei Magdeburg 1926 (Numerized).
 Danzig und das Land an der Weichsel. Beschrieben von Ernst Gall. Aufgenommen von Kurt Grimm. Deutscher Kunstverlag, Munich 1953.
 Rothenburg ob der Tauber. Munich/Berlin 1955

References

Further reading 
 Ludwig Heinrich Heydenreich: Nachruf Ernst Gall. In Reallexikon zur deutschen Kunstgeschichte vol. 5, Stuttgart 1967, o. S. (archive.today).
 Günther Grundmann: Nachruf Ernst Gall 1888–1958. In Zeitschrift für Ostforschung 7, 1958, .
 
 Margarethe Kühn, Louis Grodecki (publ.): Gedenkschrift Ernst Gall. Deutscher Kunstverlag, München, Berlin 1965 ( Schriftenverzeichnis).
 Christiane Fork: Gall, Ernst. In Peter Betthausen, Peter H. Feist, Christiane Fork (ed.): . Zweihundert Porträts deutschsprachiger Autoren aus vier Jahrhunderten. Metzler, Stuttgart 1998, .
 Friedhild Andrea Anders: Schlösser in der Stunde Null. Die Berliner und Potsdamer Schlösser während der Kriegs- und Nachkriegszeit. Potsdam 1999, .
 Matthias Noell: Ernst Gall in der Normandie – Forschungsreisen, Fotografie und der »landschaftliche Dehio«. In Zeitschrift für Kunstgeschichte 67, 2004,  (Numerized).

External links 

 

German art historians
German architectural historians
Historical preservationists
Academic staff of the Ludwig Maximilian University of Munich
Commanders Crosses of the Order of Merit of the Federal Republic of Germany
1888 births
1958 deaths
People from Gdańsk